is a Japanese football player. He plays for YSCC Yokohama.

Career
Ryotaro Yamamoto joined J2 League club Yokohama FC in 2017. On June 21, he debuted in Emperor's Cup (v Zweigen Kanazawa).

Club statistics
Updated to 22 February 2020.

References

External links
Profile at Yokohama FC

1998 births
Living people
Association football people from Chiba Prefecture
Japanese footballers
J2 League players
J3 League players
Yokohama FC players
YSCC Yokohama players
Association football midfielders